Euxoa apopsis is a moth of the family Noctuidae. It is known only from high elevations in the mountains of south-western British Columbia.

The length of the forewings is 14–15 mm.

Adults may be partially diurnal, which may explain why only two specimens were collected at the type locality in spite of many nights of collecting over a period of six years.

Etymology
The species name is a Greek noun used in apposition and means "a lofty spot", in reference to the high elevation of the type locality.

External links
A Synopsis of the westermanni Group of the Genus Euxoa Hbn. (Lepidoptera: Noctuidae) With Descriptions of Two New Species

Euxoa
Moths described in 2010
Endemic fauna of Canada
Endemic fauna of British Columbia